Abdul Wahab Joardar is a Bangladesh Army officer who is known for his role in the assassination of Sheikh Mujibur Rahman, the founding president of Bangladesh.

Career 

Joarder was part of the army team that attacked the residence of President Sheikh Mujibur Rahman during the 15 August 1975 Bangladesh coup d'état. He was the Subedar of the First Artillery regiment responsible for guarding the house of President Sheikh Mujibur Rahman. He had disarmed the soldiers before the coup. He was promoted to Lieutenant from Subedar Major after the Assassination of Sheikh Mujibur Rahman by Major Syed Faruque Rahman. Joarder was seen by witnesses looting the home of Sheikh Mujibur Rahman.

Joarder was charged with the assassination of former President of Bangladesh Sheikh Mujibur Rahman in 1998 in a case filed by AFM Muhitul Islam. On 5 January 1998, Joarder was presented before the Dhaka District and Sessions, presided by Judge Kazi Golam Rasul, along with A.K.M. Mohiuddin Ahmed, Sultan Shahriar Rashid Khan, Syed Faruque Rahman, and Taheruddin Thakur. He was represented by advocate Abdur Razzaq Khan. He, along with three other accused, former Minister Taheruddin Thakur, Dafadar Marfat Ali Shah, Dafadar Abul Hashem Mridha, were acquitted.

References 

Bangladesh Army officers
People convicted of murder by Bangladesh
Assassination of Sheikh Mujibur Rahman
Year of birth missing (living people)
Place of birth missing (living people)
Living people